The following is an overview of the events of 1897 in film, including a list of films released and notable births.



Events
 January 28 – The first Venezuelan-made films are screened at the Baralt Theatre in Maracaibo, two locally-made actuality shorts, Un célebre especialista sacando muelas en el gran Hotel Europa and Muchachos bañándose en la laguna de Maracaibo.
  May 4 – During a film screening at the Charity Bazaar in Paris, a curtain catches on fire from the ether used to fuel the projector lamp. The fire spreads and becomes catastrophic, ultimately resulting in 126 deaths.
 June 20 – Queen Victoria's Diamond Jubilee procession filmed.
 The American Vitagraph Company is founded by J. Stuart Blackton and Albert E. Smith in Brooklyn.
 Mitchell and Kenyon go into a film-making partnership at Blackburn in the north of England.
 Enoch J. Rector develops a 63 mm film format called Veriscope, which films The Corbett-Fitzsimmons Fight on March 17.
 Thomas Henry Blair develops a 48 mm film format called Viventoscope.

Films released in 1897
 After The Ball, directed by Georges Méliès. First film to create the illusion of female nudity through a skin looking designed costume
 Baignade dans le torrent, directed by Alice Guy-Blaché
 La Bandera Argentina, believed for a long time to have been the first Argentine film. Now considered lost
 Between Calais and Dover, directed by Georges Méliès. A fictitious sea crossing
 The Bewitched Inn (L'Auberge Ensorcelee), directed by Georges Méliès
 Buffalo Police on Parade, produced by Edison Studios
 The Cabinet of Mephistopheles (aka The Laboratory of Mephistopheles), directed by George Melies.
 Chicago Police Parade, directed by Louis Lumière
 The Corbett-Fitzsimmons Fight, a documentary directed by Enoch J. Rector.  The first film shot in widescreen.  At an hour and 40 minutes, it is the first known feature film ever made
 Cupid and Psyche, produced by Edison Studios
 An Hallucinated Alchemist, directed by Georges Méliès.  May be the first film to feature stop motion animation in cinema
 Faust and Marguerite, directed by George Melies.
 The Haunted Castle, directed by George Albert Smith (film pioneer) (British)
 The Haverstraw Tunnel
 Horses Loading for Klondike, directed by James H. White
 The Hypnotist at Work, directed by Georges Méliès
 Kørsel med Grønlandske Hunde, directed by Peter Elfelt; the first Danish movie sequence ever filmed
A dramatised war scene
 Leander Sisters, produced by Edison Studios
 Leaving Jerusalem by Railway, directed by Alexandre Promio and released by the Lumière brothers. May include the first moving camera shot in cinema
 Lurline Baths, produced by Edison Studios
 Making Sausages, directed by George Albert Smith
 The Milker's Mishap, directed by James H. White; it is unknown whether or not this film has survived
 New Pillow Fight, produced by Siegmund Lubin
 Niagara Falls, directed by Louis Lumière
 Old Man Drinking a Glass of Beer, directed by George Albert Smith
 On the Roofs, directed by Georges Méliès
 Peeping Tom,a production of the American Mutoscope Company. A comedy
 Prince Ranjitsinhji Practising Batting in the Nets, one of the earliest known films of Cricket
 Salida de la misa de doce de la Iglesia del Pilar de Zaragoza, a short silent film by Eduardo Jimeno, a pioneer of the Spanish cinema. Probably the first film made in Spain by a Spaniard
 Sea Fighting in Greece, directed by Georges Méliès. A dramatised naval war scene
 Seminary Girls, directed by James H. White
 Spanish Bullfight, directed by Louis Lumière
 The Surrender of Tournavos, directed by Georges Méliès. A dramatised war scene
 Sutro Baths, No. 1, produced by Edison Studios
 A Twentieth Century Surgeon, directed by George Melies
 The X-Rays, directed by George Albert Smith. Cited as one of the first examples of special effects by jump cut

Births

Debut
Marshall P. Wilder

External links

References

 
Film by year